Balofloxacin (INN) is a fluoroquinolone antibiotic. It is sold under the brand name Q-Roxin in Korea, and under various names in India. It is not approved by the FDA for use in the United States.

Pharmacodynamics 
Balofloxacin is a fluoroquinolone that has a broad spectrum in vitro activity against a wide range of Gram-positive and Gram-negative bacteria, with enhanced activity against Gram positive bacteria, including MRSA and Streptococcus pneumoniae. It functions by inhibiting the action of DNA-gyrase, preventing bacterial cells from reproducing or repairing themselves, resulting in cellular death.

Side Effects 
Vomiting, headache, dizziness, stomach pain, nausea, diarrhea and decreased liver function are the most common side effects. In rare cases, Balofloxacin can lead to or worsen tendinitis, and muscular damage.

See also 
 Quinolones

References 

Fluoroquinolone antibiotics
Phenol ethers
Piperidines
Cyclopropanes
Carboxylic acids
Aromatic ketones